Grahame Thomas (born 21 March 1938, in Croydon Park, New South Wales) is a former Australian cricketer who played in eight Tests in 1965 and 1966.

After several seasons in which he established a reputation as a hard-hitting batsman for New South Wales in the Sheffield Shield, he made his Test debut a few days short of his 27th birthday against the West Indies in 1965. He played all five Tests in that series without notable success, and returned to the Test side in the 1965–66 Ashes series when Bobby Simpson was injured, making two fifties in the last three Tests of the series.

He toured South Africa in 1966–67 although there were rumours he may not be selected due to his mixed race heritage (he was part Aboriginal and American Indian). In the final event he went on the tour but was not selected for any of the Tests, and retired from first-class cricket at the end of the tour at the age of 28 in order to concentrate on his career in the printing industry. He was a reliable fielder who occasionally kept wicket in first-class matches.

He played most of his Grade cricket in Sydney with Bankstown-Canterbury and was honoured in 2005 with the renaming of Bankstown's Memorial Outer Oval to the "Grahame Thomas Oval". He was made a life member of Cricket NSW in 2011.

See also
 List of New South Wales representative cricketers

References

External links
 
 

1938 births
Living people
Australia Test cricketers
New South Wales cricketers
Australian cricketers